Ole Christopher Wessel (12 January 1744 – 26 December 1794) was a Norwegian jurist, civil servant and landowner.

He was born in Vestby  in Akershus as the son of parish priest Jonas Wessel (1707-1785)  and Helene Marie Schumacher (1715-1789). He was a brother of poet Johan Herman Wessel and cartographer Caspar Wessel. In 1757, he entered Christiania Cathedral School  after which he was enrolled at the University of Copenhagen. In 1770, he received the job of assessor  and rose through the ranks via Court of Justice, until he in 1790 was Chief Justice. He was married to Helene Carlsen Barclay from 1779 to 1790. They parted in 1790 and in  1791 he married Maren Juel  (1749-1815), Norway's wealthiest woman, and thus became owner of the estates Hafslund Manor and  Borregaard Manor in Sarpsborg as well as Stubljan in Nordstrand.

References

1744 births
1794 deaths
People from Vestby
Norwegian jurists
Norwegian civil servants
People educated at Oslo Cathedral School
University of Copenhagen alumni
Norwegian landowners